In metallurgy, cold forming or cold working is any metalworking process in which metal is shaped below its recrystallization temperature, usually at the ambient temperature.  Such processes are contrasted with hot working techniques like hot rolling, forging, welding, etc.  The same or similar terms are used in glassmaking for the equivalents; for example cut glass is made by "cold work", cutting or grinding a formed object.

Cold forming techniques are usually classified into four major groups: squeezing, bending, drawing, and shearing.  They generally have the advantage of being simpler to carry out than hot working techniques. 

Unlike hot working, cold working causes the crystal grains and inclusions to distort following the flow of the metal; which may cause work hardening and anisotropic material properties. Work hardening makes the metal harder, stiffer, and stronger, but less plastic, and may cause cracks of the piece.

The possible uses of cold forming are extremely varied, including large flat sheets, complex folded shapes, metal tubes, screw heads and threads, riveted joints, and much more.

Processes
The following is a list of cold forming processes:

Squeezing:
Rolling
Swaging
Extrusion
Forging
Sizing
Riveting
Staking
Coining
Peening
Burnishing
Heading
Hubbing
Thread rolling
Bending:
Angle bending
Roll bending
Draw and compression
Roll forming
Seaming
Flanging
Straightening
Shearing
Sheet metal shear-cutting
Slitting
Blanking
Piercing
Lancing
Perforating
Notching
Nibbling
Shaving
Trimming
Cutoff
Dinking
Drawing
Wire drawing
Tube drawing
Metal spinning
Embossing
Stretch forming
Sheet metal drawing
Ironing
Superplastic forming

Advantages 
Advantages of cold working over hot working include:
No heating required
Better surface finish
Superior dimensional control
Better reproducibility and interchangeability
Directional properties can be imparted into the metal
Contamination problems are minimized

Depending on the material and extent of deformation, the increase in strength due to work hardening may be comparable to that of heat treating. Therefore, it is sometimes more economical to cold work a less costly and weaker metal than to hot work a more expensive metal that can be heat treated, especially if precision or a fine surface finish is required as well. 

The cold working process also reduces waste as compared to machining, or even eliminates with near net shape methods. The material savings becomes even more significant at larger volumes, and even more so when using expensive materials, such as copper, nickel, gold, tantalum, and palladium. The saving on raw material as a result of cold forming can be very significant, as is saving machining time. Production cycle times when cold working are very short. On multi-station machinery, production cycle times are even less. This can be very advantageous for large production runs.

Disadvantages
Some disadvantages and problems of cold working are:
The metal is harder, calling for greater forces, harder tools and dies, and heavier equipment
The metal is less ductile and malleable, limiting the amount of deformation that can be obtained
Metal surfaces must be clean and scale-free
May leave undesirable anisotropy in the final piece
May leave undesirable residual stress in the final piece

The need for heavier equipment and harder tools may make cold working suitable only for large volume manufacturing industry.

The loss of plasticity due to work hardening may require intermediate annealings, and a final annealing  to relieve residual stress and give the desired properties to the manufactured object. These extra steps would negate some of the economic advantages of cold forming over hot forming.

Cold worked items suffer from a phenomenon known as springback, or elastic springback. After the deforming force is removed from the workpiece, the workpiece springs back slightly. The amount a material springs back is equal to the yield strain (the strain at the yield point) for the material.

Special precautions may be needed to maintain the general shape of the workpiece during cold working, such as shot peening and equal channel angular extrusion.

References 

Metalworking